Smart Choice Moosa Stadium is a cricket stadium in Pearland, Texas. The stadium is owned by Smart Choice, a former sponsor of the United States national cricket team. It is named after Smart Choice CEO Sakhi Muhammad’s father. It is home for American College Cricket.

Main Event Field

Cricket 

In April 2015, it was announced that Canada cricket team would travel to Houston to play three warm-up matches against an invitational XI ahead of the ICC Americas Division One T20 tournament.

From July to September 2021, the stadium was used as the Austin Athletics' home ground for Minor League Cricket. 

In March 2022, Major League Cricket announced that it was planning investments to enhance the stadium, and that the venue would bid as a possible venue for the 2024 ICC Men's T20 World Cup. In April 2022, USA Cricket announced that the stadium would be the second ODI-accredited venue, following the Central Broward Park in Broward County, Florida, pending approval from the International Cricket Council later the following month. The stadium was then slated to host 12 ODIs that would be part of the Cricket World Cup League Two over May and June 2022.

List of centuries

One Day International centuries 
The following table summarises the One Day International (ODI) centuries scored at the site.

International five-wicket hauls 
The following table summarises the international five-wicket hauls taken here at the site.

References

External links
 

Cricket grounds in the United States
Sports venues completed in 2015
2015 establishments in Texas
Pearland, Texas
Cricket in Texas